Josef Dieter "Sepp" Maier (born 28 February 1944) is a German former professional football goalkeeper who played for Bayern Munich and the Germany national football team. Regarded as one of football's greatest goalkeepers, he was nicknamed "Die Katze von Anzing" ("the cat from Anzing") for his fast reflexes, agility, flexibility, speed, and consistency; in addition to his shot-stopping ability, Maier was also known for his ability to dominate his box, as well as his sense of humour and personality throughout his career, which made him a fan favourite. Regarding his playing style, he once quipped "a keeper should give off a sense of calm, and not fall asleep while doing so."

Club career

Born in Metten, Bavaria, Maier spent his entire professional career at Bayern Munich. He began playing for Bayern's youth sides in 1958. During the 1970s, he was part of the legendary Bayern team which included the likes of Franz Beckenbauer and Gerd Müller which won four West German league titles, three German cups, and three consecutive European Cups (1974 defeating Atlético Madrid, 1975 defeating Leeds United, 1976 defeating AS Saint-Étienne). He had previously tasted success in Europe in 1967 when Bayern won the European Cup Winners Cup, defeating Rangers F.C. in the final in extra time. In the five games of the four European finals, the 1974 title having been won in a replay, Maier allowed a total of one goal.

Maier was elected German Footballer of the Year in 1975, 1977, and 1978. Between 1966 and 1979 he played in 442 consecutive Bundesliga matches, still a German national record.

International career

Maier was selected in the West Germany squad for four consecutive World Cups. In 1966 in England, he was a non-playing deputy to Hans Tilkowski. At the 1970 FIFA World Cup in Mexico, he was the undisputed starter and played all games (including the legendary 4–3 semifinal loss to Italy after extra time) except the third-place match.

In the 1974 FIFA World Cup on home soil, at the top of his footballing abilities, he reached the peak of his international career as the Germans went all the way to the final with a legendary team that included the likes of Franz Beckenbauer, Berti Vogts, Gerd Müller and Paul Breitner. The greatest triumph came when the hosts defeated a Johan Cruyff-led Netherlands team 2–1 in the final in Maier's own hometown Munich.

Four years later at the World Cup in Argentina, slightly past his peak but still formidable, Maier delivered a strong performance but could not prevent his side's failing to advance past the second round. Maier also won the 1972 European Championship with West Germany and reached the final in 1976, losing to Czechoslovakia on penalty kicks. On this occasion he was on the receiving end of the original Panenka penalty. In all, he earned 95 caps for his country.

Post-playing career
Maier went into coaching for both club and country and mentored Oliver Kahn. In October 2004 his contract with the national side was terminated by manager Jürgen Klinsmann after Maier spoke out in favour of Kahn over Arsenal's Jens Lehmann in a dispute over who should be the side's first-choice goalkeeper. He continued to work as head goalkeeping coach for Bayern and retired in 2008.

Personal life

Besides his goalkeeping exploits, Maier was famous for his overlong shorts and being the first goalkeeper to wear the now-standard, outsize, "Mickey Mouse" gloves, as well as his sense of humour. He is remembered for an incident where he became bored during a match at the Olympiastadion as the opposing side had yet to threaten his goal. A duck wandered onto the pitch and Maier attempted to catch it.

In June 2009, Maier was honoured by the Bavarian government with the Life Achievement Award.

Career statistics

Honours

Bayern Munich
 Regionalliga Süd: 1964–65
 Bundesliga: 1968–69, 1971–72, 1972–73, 1973–74
 DFB-Pokal: 1965–66, 1966–67, 1968–69, 1970–71
 European Cup: 1973–74, 1974–75, 1975–76
 European Cup Winners' Cup: 1966–67
 Intercontinental Cup: 1976

West Germany
 FIFA World Cup: 1974
 UEFA European Championship: 1972

Individual
 FIFA World Cup All-Star Team: 1974
 kicker Bundesliga Team of the Season: 1974–75
 Footballer of the Year (Germany): 1975, 1977, 1978
 FIFA 100
 Germany's goalkeeper of the Century
 World Soccer: The 100 Greatest Footballers of All Time
 One Club Man Award: 2017
 Bayern Munich All-time XI
 Member of Germany's Sports Hall of Fame

See also
List of one-club men

References

1944 births
Living people
People from Deggendorf (district)
Sportspeople from Lower Bavaria
German footballers
Germany international footballers
Germany youth international footballers
Association football goalkeepers
FC Bayern Munich footballers
FIFA 100
FIFA World Cup-winning players
1966 FIFA World Cup players
1970 FIFA World Cup players
1974 FIFA World Cup players
1978 FIFA World Cup players
UEFA European Championship-winning players
UEFA Euro 1972 players
UEFA Euro 1976 players
Bundesliga players
FC Bayern Munich non-playing staff
Recipients of the Cross of the Order of Merit of the Federal Republic of Germany
Footballers from Bavaria
West German footballers
Association football goalkeeping coaches